Sohorab Ali Sana (Born: 1 February 1946) is a Bangladesh Awami League politician and the former Member of Parliament of Khulna-6.

Career
Sana was elected to parliament from Khulna-6 as a Bangladesh Awami League candidate in 2008.

References

Awami League politicians
Living people
9th Jatiya Sangsad members
1946 births
University of Rajshahi alumni